Neighbourhood Council is an Administrative Unit in Khyber Pakhtunkhwa (KPK). It is notified in Khyber Pakhtunkhwa Local Government Act 2013.

Ward is similar to Union Council, But Ward is a new term and new demarcation by Khyber Pakhtunkhwa Government.
While Union Councils are based upon West Pakistan Land Revenue Act, 1967 (W.P. Act No. XVII of 1967)

Ward  may consist of:
 Village Council or  
 Neighbourhood Council

Village Council is rural places, while Neighbourhood Councils  are urban and they are near to main city or have characteristics of city.

In Khyber Pakhtunkhwa there are total 2996 Village Councils.
and 505 Neighborhood Councils. While total amount of Union Councils is 1001.

See also 
 Village Council (KPK)
 Ward (KPK)
 KPK Local Government Act 2013 (Village Council)
 Babuzai

References

External links
 Neighbourhood Council
 Local Bodies Government

Government of Khyber Pakhtunkhwa